Women's Property is a Russian 1999 romantic drama based on the eponymous story by Valentin Chernykh, directed by Dmitry Meskhiev.

Plot
A young entrant, Andrei Kalinin, passes exams to a theatrical institute. He lacks artistic acumen yet has plenty of charm. After getting to know that there are chances he won't succeed, he decides to convince a member of the committee, Elizaveta Kamenskaya, that he has to enroll exactly that very year. In a sequence of chance events, Andrey falls for her - the prominent actress he used to admire being a child. She is much older than him and lonely. After a few years of relationships, it turns out that she has cancer. Despite her incurable illness, Andrei marries Elizaveta. After her death, his professional life becomes unstable - while his romantic affairs are taking even more unpredictable turns.

Cast
Konstantin Khabensky - Andrei Kalinin
Elena Safonova - Elizaveta Kamenskaya, teacher of the theatrical institute
Aleksandr Abdulov - Sazonov, principal of the theatrical institute
Amalia Mordvinova - Olga
Nina Usatova - Raika, film director
Yury Kuznetsov - Kolosov, theatre director
Viktor Bychkov - Igor
Ilya Shakunov - Anton
Andrei Zibrov - Kostya, Olga's ex-husband
Tatyana Tkach - Mira, film director
Tatyana Lyutaeva - Zoya Borschevskaya
Aleksandr Polovtsev - Yasha, group leader
Mikhail Porechenkov - episode
Lyubov Tischenko - neighbor

Awards
1999 - Best Actress award at the international film festival of actors "Constellation" (Sozvezdie) of the Russian Film Actors Guild (Elena Safonova).
2000 - Best Actress award at the 6th Russian film festival "Literature and Cinema" in Gatchina (Nina Usatova).
2000 - Best Actor award at the 6th Russian film festival "Literature and Cinema" in Gatchina (Konstantin Khabensky).
2000 - Prize of the press "for providing the best program of films" at the VIII All-Russian Film Festival "Vivat, Cinema of Russia!" in St. Petersburg (Dmitry Meskhiev).

References

External links

Russian romantic drama films
1999 romantic drama films
1999 films
Films directed by Dmitry Meskhiev
1990s satirical films
Russian satirical films
1990s Russian-language films